Hongkongers, also known as Hong Kongers, Hongkongian, Hong Kongese, Hongkongese, Hong Kong citizens and Hong Kong people, are demonyms that typically refers to residents of the territory of Hong Kong; although may also refer to others who were born and/or raised in the territory.

The earliest inhabitants of Hong Kong are indigenous villagers, who have lived in the area since before British colonization. The majority of Hongkongers today are descended from Han Chinese migrants from mainland China, most of whom are Cantonese and trace their ancestral home to the province of Guangdong. However, the territory also holds other Han Chinese subgroups including the Hakka, Hoklo, Teochew (Chiuchow), Shanghainese, Sichuanese and Taiwanese. Meanwhile, non-Han Chinese Hongkongers such as the British, Filipinos, Indonesians, South Asians and Vietnamese also make up six per cent of Hong Kong's population.

Terminology
The terms Hongkonger and Hong Kongese are used to denote a residents of Hong Kong, including permanent and non-permanent residents. According to the Oxford English Dictionary, the word Hongkonger first appeared in the English language in an 1870 edition of The Daily Independent, an American-based newspaper. In March 2014, both the terms Hongkonger and Hong Kongese were added to the Oxford English Dictionary.

In contrast, the Merriam-Webster Dictionary of American English adopts the form Hong Konger instead. The form Hong Konger also seems to be preferred by governments around the world. In 2008, the U.S. Government Publishing Office decided to include Hong Konger as a demonym for Hong Kong in its official Style Manual. The Companies House of the UK government similarly added Hong Konger to its standard list of nationalities in September 2020.

The aforementioned terms all translate to the same term in Cantonese, 香港人. The direct translation of this is Hong Kong person.

During the British colonial era, terms like Hong Kong Chinese and Hong Kong Britons were used to distinguish the British and Chinese populations that lived in the city.

Residency status

The term Hongkongers most often refers to legal residents of Hong Kong, as recognised under Hong Kong Basic Law. Hong Kong Basic Law gives a precise legal definition of a Hong Kong resident. Under Article 24 of the Basic Law, Hong Kong residents can be further classified as permanent or non-permanent residents. Non-permanent residents are those who have the right to hold a Hong Kong Identity Card, but have no right to abode in Hong Kong. Permanent residents are those who have the right to hold a Hong Kong Permanent Identity Card as well as the right of abode.

The Basic Law allows residents to acquire right of abode by birth in Hong Kong, or in some other ways. For example, residents of China may settle in Hong Kong for family reunification purposes if they obtain a one-way permit (for which there may be a waiting time of several years).

Formally speaking, Hong Kong does not confer its own citizenship, although the term Hong Kong citizen is used colloquially to refer to permanent residents of the city. Hong Kong does not require applicants for naturalisation to take a language test to become a permanent resident. However, Hong Kong migrants and residents are assumed to understand their obligation under Article 24 of the Hong Kong Basic Law to abide by the laws of Hong Kong.

Ethnicity and background

According to Hong Kong's 2016 census, 92 per cent of its population is ethnically Chinese, with 32.1 per cent having been born in Mainland China, Taiwan or Macau. Historically, many Chinese people have migrated from areas such as Canton to Hong Kong, for example in the 1850s–60s as a result of the Taiping Rebellion and in the 1940s prior to the establishment of the People's Republic of China in 1949. Thus, immigrants from Guangdong and their descendants have long constituted the majority of the ethnic Chinese residents of Hong Kong, which accounts for the city's broad Cantonese culture. The Cantonese language, a form of Yue Chinese, is the primary language of Hong Kong and that used in the media and education. For that reason, while there are groups with ancestral roots in more distant parts of China such as Shanghai and Shandong, as well as members of other Han Chinese subgroups such as Hakka, Hokkien, and Teochew, residents who are Hong Kong-born and/or raised often assimilate into the mainstream Cantonese identity of Hong Kong and typically adopt Cantonese as their first language.

Ethnic minorities
In addition to the Han Chinese majority, Hong Kong's minority population also comprises many other different ethnic and national groups, with the largest non-Chinese groups being Filipinos (1.9 per cent) and Indonesians (also 1.9 per cent). There are long-established South Asian communities, which comprise both descendants of 19th and early 20th-century migrants as well as more recent short-term expatriates. South Asians include Indian, Pakistani, and Nepalese, who respectively made up 0.4 per cent, 0.3 per cent, and 0.2 per cent of Hong Kong's population in 2011. Smaller groups include Americans, Britons, Canadians, Australians, New Zealanders, Japanese, Koreans, Russians, Vietnamese and Thais. In 2011, 0.8 per cent of Hong Kong's population were European, many (53.5 per cent) of whom resided on Hong Kong Island, where they constitute 2.3 per cent of the population.

Hong Kong includes:：Indigenous inhabitants of the New Territories, Tanka people, Hakka people
Guangzhou and Macau includes: Humen, Cixi, Zhongshan, Hua County, Wanshan Archipelago, Nanhai, Bao'an County, Panyu, Sanshui, Shenzhen, Shilong Shunde, Dapeng, Zengcheng, Conghua, Dongguan, Huiyang
Sze Yap incldes：Kaiping, Heshan, Jiangmen, Xinhui, Taishan, Enping
Chaozhou includes: Shantou, Chenghai, Chao'an, Chaoyang, Fengshun, Jieyang, Nan'ao District, Nanshan , Puning, Huilai, Raoping	
Other places in Guangdong include: Hainan administrative region and other places。

Languages

Religion

Cultural identity

Hong Kong culture is primarily a mix of Chinese and Western influences, stemming from Lingnan Cantonese roots and later fusing with British culture due to British colonialism (Traditional Chinese: 粵英薈萃). From 26 January 1841 to 30 June 1997, Hong Kong was formally a British Dependent Territory. English was introduced as an official language of Hong Kong during British colonial rule, alongside the indigenous Chinese language, notably Cantonese. While it was an overseas territory, Hong Kong participated in a variety of organisations from the Commonwealth Family network. Hong Kong ended its participation with most Commonwealth Family organisations after the handover of Hong Kong in 1997; although still participates in the Association of Commonwealth Universities and the Commonwealth Lawyers Association. Moreover, Hong Kong also has indigenous people and ethnic minorities from South and Southeast Asia, whose cultures all play integral parts in modern day Hong Kong culture. As a result, after the 1997 transfer of sovereignty to the People's Republic of China, Hong Kong has continued to develop a unique identity under the rubric of One Country Two Systems.

After the handover of Hong Kong, the University of Hong Kong surveyed Hong Kong residents about how they defined themselves. In its latest poll published in June 2022, 39.1% of respondents identified as Hong Konger, 31.4% as Hong Konger in China, 17.6% as Chinese, 10.9% as Chinese in Hong Kong, and 42.4% as mixed identity.

Diaspora

Mainland China holds the largest number of Hong Kong expatriates, although the Hong Kong diaspora can also be found in Taiwan and several English-speaking countries. Most Hongkongers living outside of Greater China form a part of the larger overseas Chinese community. The migration of Hongkongers to other parts of the world accelerated in the years prior to the handover of Hong Kong in 1997, although a significant percentage returned. Another emigration wave occurred after the 2019–2020 Hong Kong protests and the United Kingdom's enactment of the BNO visa scheme.

See also
Diasporic communities in Hong Kong:

 Africans
 Americans
 Australians
 Britons
 Canadians
 Filipinos
 Foreign domestic helpers in Hong Kong
 French
 Indonesians
 Japanese
 Koreans
 Russians
 Shanghainese
 South Asians
 Taiwanese
 Thais
 Vietnamese

Culture:

 Code-switching in Hong Kong
 Culture of Hong Kong
 Hong Kong drifter
 Hong Kong Kids phenomenon
 Hong Kong name
 Hong Kong returnee
 Indigenous inhabitants of the New Territories
 Lion Rock Spirit
 Religion in Hong Kong
 Youth in Hong Kong

Miscellaneous:

 Bilingualism in Hong Kong
 British National (Overseas)
 Hong Kong returnee
 New immigrants in Hong Kong
 Waves of mass migrations from Hong Kong
 British nationality law and Hong Kong

Notes

References

External links
 

Demographics of Hong Kong
Ethnic groups in Hong Kong
Hong Kong society